The Yanuncay River is a river of Ecuador. It runs through the city of Cuenca.

See also
List of rivers of Ecuador

References
 Rand McNally, The New International Atlas, 1993.
  GEOnet Names Server
 Water Resources Assessment of Ecuador

Rivers of Ecuador
Geography of Azuay Province